Luboš Horčička (born 21 May 1979) is a Czech professional ice hockey goaltender. He played with HC Plzeň in the Czech Extraliga during the 2010–11 season.

Horčička previously played for HC Kladno, HC Oceláři Třinec, SK Kadaň, KLH Chomutov and Orli Znojmo.

References

External links 
 
 

1979 births
Living people
Czech ice hockey goaltenders
HC Plzeň players
Sportspeople from Kladno
Rytíři Kladno players
HC Oceláři Třinec players
Piráti Chomutov players
PSG Berani Zlín players
HC Most players
Orli Znojmo players
HC ZUBR Přerov players
LHK Jestřábi Prostějov players
MsHK Žilina players
Czech expatriate ice hockey players in Slovakia
HC Litvínov players